Marc Parent may refer to:

Marc Parent (executive) (born 1961), French-Canadian business executive
Marc Parent (police), former Chief of the Montreal Police Service

See also
Mark Parent (born 1954), Canadian clergyman and former politician